Beavertown Brewery is a British brewery based in Tottenham, London, 100% owned by Heineken.

Beavertown was founded in 2011 by Logan Plant, the son of Robert Plant, singer with Led Zeppelin. The brewery's name came from the nickname for de Beauvoir Town, the area of London where its first beer was brewed at Duke’s Brew & Que on Downham Road, London N1, and which was unexpectedly closed in 2017.  

In June 2018, it was announced that Heineken would be buying a minority stake, so that Beavertown could spend £40 million on a new brewery and visitor site. The new brewery was launched in 2020, with a capacity of 500,000 hectolitres, a ten-fold increase in their previous capacity.

Beavertown currently produce mostly IPAs, with special seasonal beers on rotation.

Ownership
, Heineken UK own 11,196 (49.5%) of the 'A' shares of TP & Munch Ltd, which owns 100% of both Beavertown Brewery Ltd and the dormant Lost Star Ltd. Logan Plant owns 5,833 'A' shares (25.8%) and his wife Bridget owns 5,605 'A' shares (24.8%). Creative Director Nick Dwyer has 105 'B' shares; operations director Nikola Marjanovic Heineken have also made a loan via TP & Munch that is secured on the brewery's assets and trademarks.

On 31 August 2022, Bridget and Logan Plant resigned their directorships of TP & Munch Ltd, leaving Heineken UK Limited with full control of the company.

See also
 List of breweries in England

References

External links
 

Breweries in London
British companies established in 2011
Food and drink companies established in 2011
Heineken